Aambala is a 2015 Indian Tamil-language action comedy film co-written, co-produced and directed by Sundar C. Produced by Vishal, it features him in the leading role alongside an ensemble cast including Hansika Motwani, Prabhu, Vaibhav, Santhanam, Sathish,  Ramya Krishnan, Kiran Rathod, Aishwarya, Maadhavi Latha, Madhuurima, and Pradeep Rawat. The music was composed by Hiphop Tamizha.

The film released on 14 January 2015 on the occasion of Pongal with mixed reviews and ended up as a decent hit clashing towards with I and Darling.

Plot
Saravanan (Vishal) lives in Ooty, and runs a business of gathering people for politicians and events. One day, he meets Maya (Hansika Motwani), and falls for her. However, "RDX" Rajasekhar (Santhanam) also falls in love with her. Saravanan convinces Rajasekhar to not fall for Maya by saying she's too high class. Rajasekhar is a police inspector. Due to several mishaps caused, he is fired and starts working as a hotel doorman. He is shocked to find Saravanan and Maya going out together. He asks Saravanan how he made Maya fall in love with him. As Saravanan finishes his story, it is revealed Saravanan indirectly caused those mishaps that led to Rajasekhar's firing. Enraged, Rajasekhar hires Kumaran (Vaibhav), who is a specialist in breakups. Kumaran then sends a woman (Andrea Jeremiah) to cause a conflict in Saravanan and Maya's relationship.

Due to his love failure, Saravanan becomes drunk and falls unconscious. Kumaran, who is also at the bar, drops Saravanan off at his house. Saravanan's mother Thulasi (Tulasi), ashamed of his behaviour, sends him to meet his father Aalavanthan (Prabhu) and younger brother Shakthi (Sathish) at Madurai. There, they meet Aalavanthan and rejoin him. They come to know that Kumaran is also the son of Aalavanthan's ex-lover.

Aalavanthan reveals to his sons that they have three aunts: Periya Ponnu (Ramya Krishnan), Nadu Ponnu (Aishwarya), and Chinna Ponnu (Kiran Rathod). Aalavanthan wants his sons to marry the daughters of their aunts so that their families can reunite once and for all. A reluctant Saravanan helps his brothers and father attend a temple function in disguise to kidnap and marry their cousins, but they kidnap their aunts. They run away before getting caught. Saravanan agrees to the plan after finding out that Periya Ponnu's daughter is none other than Maya.

Periya Ponnu believes the kidnapping was by Pasupathy (Pradeep Rawat), the MLA and ex-servant of Aalavanthan's family. Periya Ponnu decides to run against him in the next election. Pasupathy sends men to kill the aunts, but the brothers save them, disguised as police officers. Using this disguise, the trio gains access to their aunts' house. There, their uncles (Abhishek, Sriman, Gowtham Sundararajan) help facilitate the brothers' affection to their daughters. The trio succeeds in gaining the daughters' love.

Pasupathy provokes Periya Ponnu by wagering that if he loses to her, he will work at her home as a servant, but if she loses, her daughter Maya will marry his son (Rajeev Govinda Pillai). Using his knowledge of politics, Saravanan helps his aunt gain popularity. However, a few days before the elections, the aunts find out that Saravanan's father is their brother Aalavanthan, who they believe killed their father. Their hatred towards Aalavanthan results in them getting Saravanan and his brothers arrested.

Aalavanthan is hurt by his sisters' harsh words at him. He suffers a heart attack and is hospitalised. As Saravanan and his brothers are stuck in jail, his aunt has lost her popularity, due to Pasupathy's manipulation. Saravanan calls Rajasekhar, who bails out the brothers, and inadvertently exposes Pasupathy's dirty tricks. Refusing to lose, Pasupathy tries to bribe people to vote for him, but Saravanan and Kumaran foil his plan, giving Periya Ponnu the edge. Pasupathy arrives at the home to kill the family and take Maya, but Maya already escaped to elope with Saravanan. Saravanan, though, insists they go back. A furious Pasupathy reveals that he was the one who killed Aalavanthan's father, not Aalavanthan. He attacks Periya Ponnu just as Maya and Saravanan return. Saravanan fights Pasupathy and his son. At last, when Pasupathy goes to get his men, he finds that all the men assembled were the gang members of Saravanan, which definitely defeating him. The family reunites, and celebrate the weddings of all three brothers to their cousins.

Cast

 Vishal as Saravanan
 Hansika Motwani as Maya, Periya Ponnu's daughter
 Prabhu as Aalavanthan
 Vaibhav as Kumaran,  Saravanan and Shakti half brother,  Aalavandhan 2nd son  
 Sathish as Shaktivel, Saravanan Younger Brother, Aalavandhan 3rd Son
 Santhanam as Inspector RDX Rajasekhar 
 Ramya Krishnan as Periya Ponnu (sister of Chinna Ponnu and Nadu Poonu)
 Kiran Rathod as Chinna Ponnu (sister of Nadu Ponnu and Periya Poonu)
 Aishwarya as Nadu Ponnu (sister of Chinna Ponnu and Periya Poonu)
 Madhuurima as Chinna Ponnu's daughter
 Maadhavi Latha as Nadu Ponnu's daughter
 Tulasi as Tulasi, Saravanan's mother
 Pradeep Rawat as Pasupathy
 Rajeev Govinda Pillai as Pasupathy's son
 Abhishek as Periya Ponnu's husband
 Sriman as Nadu Ponnu's husband
 Gowtham Sundararajan as Chinna Ponnu's husband
 Raj Kapoor as Saravanan's uncle
 Vijayakumar as Solavandhan, Aalavanthan's father
 Manobala as Commissioner
 Mohana as Maya's friend
 Vichu Vishwanath as Periya Ponnu's bodyguard
 Santhana Bharathi as Thalaivar
 Kanal Kannan as Henchman
 George Maryan as Eli Josiyam
Thalapathy Dinesh
 Andrea Jeremiah as herself (cameo appearance)
 Poonam Bajwa as a bar dancer in an item song "Madras to Madurai"
 Khushbu as herself in a special appearance "Aye Aye"
 Hiphop Tamizha Aadhi as himself in a special appearance "Inbam Pongum Vennila"

Production
Vishal and Sundar C. announced that they would collaborate for a second venture in late May 2014, despite their first film, Madha Gaja Raja, remaining unreleased. Hansika Motwani was selected for the project, collaborating with director Sundar C for his third consecutive film  and Yuvan Shankar Raja was selected to compose the music for the film. He later opted out of the project and Sundar C announced that five different composers would work on the project including Adhi of Hiphop Tamizha. It was confirmed that Hiphop Tamizha's Adhi would be the only music director to compose all tracks for this film instead of five music directors. In the song "Aye Aye Aye" Kushboo made a cameo appearance. Three former lead actresses were reported to play Vishal's aunts in the film. Simran was rumored to have been signed for one of the three roles, before "a source close to the unit" informed that Ramya Krishnan, Aishwarya and Kiran Rathod had been finalized for the roles. Besides Motwani, the film was said to feature two more heroines, who played the daughters of the three aunts, with Telugu actresses Madhuurima and Maadhavi Latha being recruited for the roles in September 2014.

The team began production work on the film from 10 July 2014. The team shot some scenes in Kumbakonam with Vishal and Sathish. After a single schedule, the team announced that a non-stop schedule would take place from September 2014. Filming was then moved to Senthil studios, located at Vadapalani, Chennai. The audio was released on 27 December 2014 in Sathyam Cinemas.

Music

The soundtrack was composed by Hiphop Tamizha (a duo consisting of Adhi and Jeeva), making their debut as film music directors. The album consists of six tracks with one of them being a remix of the song "Inbam Pongum" from Veerapandiya Kattabomman (1959). All lyrics were written by Hip-hop Tamizha's Adhi, who had also sung three numbers.

IBTimes rated the album 3.5 out of 5 and stated that the songs are "highly energetic, which are mixed with some heavy beats". Indiaglitz gave it 3.5 out of 5.

Release

Theatrical
The film was released on 15 January 2015 coinciding with Pongal festival.

Home media
The satellite rights of the film were sold to Sun TV.

Reception

Critical response
The film received mixed reviews from critics. Behindwoods rated the film 2.25 out of 5 and stated, "Sundar C's box office winning formula of comedy, glamour, drama and action continues this time too". Indiaglitz gave 3 out of 5 and stated, "Aambala sums up action, masala and romance in the totality of rib-tickling humor. There is a clean romance, a thick storyline, packed with agreeable fights, crafted beautifully and delivered on a platter of humour, that hardly a moment skips without laughing. Vishal, Sundar C and team have launched themselves unshakable, devoid of being overshadowed, on a high entertainment genre, this festive season". Rediff gave 3.5 stars out 5 and called it a "masala entertainer with plenty of romance, over-the-top action, humour and great music". Sify stated, "There isn't one quiet moment in Aambala, a masala comic entertainer which is purely targeted at audiences seeking mindless actioners laced with family sentiments, comedy and plenty of glamour" and added, "If you leave your logic minds at home; there are chances that you might enjoy this ride.".

IBN Live rated 1.5 out of 5 and stated, "Sundar C shines in moments... Yet the film turns out to be, at the end, a reckless stitching up of humorous GIFs. This is because the film has no scope for entertaining the audience anew". The Times of India rated the film 2.5 out of 5 and called Aambala a "masala movie that is a trip through time, and not in a good way. The film is filled with tropes that would have been acceptable in the 90s. We have families that are separated because of an incident in the past, lost-and-found moments, henpecked husbands, botched up kidnapping plans, outdated athai ponnu romance, and so on. It is only the comedy scenes that keep reminding us that we are watching a Sundar C film, but even these become tiresome and even crass at times". IANS gave 1 star out of 5 and called it "unarguably the worst product to have come out of Sundar's factory... the film turns out to be a clichéd rehash of several family stories with adequate dose of action and nauseating comedy".

References

External links
 

2015 films
2015 masala films
Films directed by Sundar C.
2010s Tamil-language films
Films scored by Hiphop Tamizha
Indian action comedy films
2015 action comedy films
2015 comedy films